Cynapes is a genus of African jumping spiders that was first described by Eugène Louis Simon in 1900.

Species
 it contains four species, found only in Africa:
Cynapes baptizatus (Butler, 1876) – Mauritius (Rodriguez)
Cynapes canosus Simon, 1900 – Mauritius
Cynapes lineatus (Vinson, 1863) – Réunion, Mauritius
Cynapes wrighti (Blackwall, 1877) (type) – Seychelles

References

Salticidae
Salticidae genera
Spiders of Africa